Qrocodiledundee is a genus of braconid wasps in the family Braconidae. There is at one described species in Qrocodiledundee, Q. outbackense. Unsurprisingly, it is found in Australia.

References

Microgastrinae